"Candidatus Ulvibacter alkanivorans" is a candidatus bacterium from the genus Ulvibacter.

References

Ulvibacter alkanivorans
Bacteria described in 2019